The  are a subtropical island group  southwest of Okinawa Island in Japan.

Geography
Four islands are inhabited: Tokashiki Island, Zamami Island, Aka Island, and Geruma Island. The islands are administered as Tokashiki Village and Zamami Village within Shimajiri District.  The Kerama-shotō coral reef is a Ramsar Site.

The archipelago consists of the following islands (-jima/-shima) - inhabited ones are highlighted in blue - and rocks (other suffixes, unnamed entries) with an area of at least 0.01 km².

Flora
The archipelago has several extensive coral reefs. Two of them were designated as Ramsar sites in November 2005: a 120-hectare area along the west coast of Tokashiki-jima and around Hanari-jima, and a 233-hectare area around Ijakaja-jima, Gahi-jima and Agenashiku-jima , i.e. H. between Aka Island and Zamami Island. These reefs are home to 248 different coral species, most notably of the Acropora genus. On March 5, 2014, the waters and the islands were placed under protection as Kerama Shotō National Park.

Beaches
These are notable beaches of the Kerama Islands:

Fauna
The islands of Aka, Fukaji, Geruma and Yakabi provide the sole natural habitat of the endangered Kerama deer (Cervus nippon keramae), thought to be an introduced population of the Japanese sika deer in the early 17th century that has since adapted to their island environment.

History
The Kerama islands were historically part of the Ryukyu Kingdom (1429–1879), when islanders were employed as navigators on the kingdom’s trading vessels to China.

During World War II and preliminary to the Battle of Okinawa, soldiers of the 77th Infantry Division landed in the Kerama Islands on March 26, 1945. Further landings followed, and the Kerama group was secured over the next five days. Kerama was used as a staging area for the assault on Okinawa. During the battle the first civilian mass suicides that later marked the Battle of Okinawa took place.

Thereafter, the archipelago, like the rest of the Ryukyu Islands, was under US military administration before being returned to Japan in 1972.

The Kerama islands was the site of a true story about romance between two dogs who lived on neighboring islands that was made into the 1988 Japanese film I Want to See Marilyn (Marilyn ni Aitai).  It is now a popular beach and diving destination for visitors to Okinawa.

Transportation
The Kerama Islands are served by the Kerama Airport, located on Fukaji Island. Regular ferries are also available from Naha to the three largest islands, Aka, Zamami, and Tokashiki. Ferries between the islands are also available, as are boat tours.

References

External links

IMDB entry for I Want to See Marilyn

 
Archipelagoes of Japan
Ramsar sites in Japan
Okinawa Islands
Landforms of Okinawa Prefecture
Archipelagoes of the Pacific Ocean